Harry Leander Ells (November 9, 1854 - March 7, 1943) served in the California State Assembly for the 22nd district from 1903 to 1907. He was born in Canada. He was a pioneering resident who served as Richmond, California's postmaster, a member of its first school board, and an assemblyman representing Contra Costa County.

Harry Ells High School was named after him.

References

1854 births
1943 deaths
Republican Party members of the California State Assembly